The Alhambra Theatre in Higher Openshaw, Manchester, England, was opened in 1910, part of the H. D. Moorhouse Theatre Circuit, but it had been converted to a cinema by the outbreak of the First World War in 1914. The cinema was converted into a bingo hall in the early 1960s. The auditorium was finally used as a sporting club, and what remained of the building was used as a restaurant, storage space and glass works. The Alhambra was demolished in 2009 to make way for a new Morrisons supermarket.

References

Citations

Bibliography

Theatres in Manchester
1910 establishments in England
Demolished buildings and structures in Manchester
Former buildings and structures in Manchester
History of Manchester
Buildings and structures demolished in 2009
Theatres completed in 1910
2009 disestablishments in England